Clay Township is an inactive township in Lafayette County, in the U.S. state of Missouri.

Clay Township was established in 1825, taking its name from Kentucky statesman Henry Clay.

References

Townships in Missouri
Townships in Lafayette County, Missouri
1825 establishments in Missouri